Walls is a town located in northern DeSoto County, Mississippi, United States, near the Mississippi River, part of the larger region known as "The Delta", and known for its rich, dark soil. As it is in the upper northwest corner of Mississippi, it is in the Memphis, Tennessee metropolitan area. Its ZIP code is 38680. As of the 2010 census it had a population of 1,162, with an estimated population of 1,463 in 2018.

History
A relatively young community, Walls was originally named "Alpika", an old Chickasaw Indian word. The name was changed to Walls in 1906.

Walls was named after Captain June Walls, who served in the Civil War. Captain Walls was an early settler and merchant of the region in the 1880s.

A Mississippian culture village site near Walls, the Walls Site, gives its name to the Walls phase, the last prehistoric cultural expression before European contact. The historic trail of Hernando de Soto leads through DeSoto County to near Walls.

Today, Walls is a community rich in agriculture. Cotton, soybeans, rice and corn are planted each spring. The railroad played a vital part in the growth of the area in the early to mid 1900s. The mechanical revolution of the 1950s and 1960s changed Walls, as well as many other Delta communities.

A significant part of the community is the Sacred Heart League, operator of the Sacred Heart School in Walls. The league raised funds through the sale of a famous statue of Jesus Christ. In the 1960s, the statue could be found on the dashboards of vehicles across America.

The town of Walls, which has been a community since the early 1900s, was connected to the tiny village of Memphis which was incorporated in the early 1970s and was located just south of the Walls community. In 2003/2004, the village of Memphis was annexed, thereby giving the town of Walls the official status of a municipality.

Geography
Average temperatures:
January = 39.4 F
July = 81.1 F

Subdivisions (in the city limits)
Kaitlin Ridge
Mallard Park
Encore

Neighboring cities
Memphis, Tennessee (north)
Horn Lake (east)
Tunica Resorts (southwest)

Demographics

2020 census

As of the 2020 United States Census, there were 1,351 people, 445 households, and 325 families residing in the town.

Education
Walls is served by the DeSoto County School District.

Secondary schools
Lake Cormorant Middle School
Lake Cormorant High School

Elementary schools
Walls Elementary
Lake Cormorant Elementary

Growth and expansion

Leatherman Development
The Leatherman family has begun to develop industrial, commercial and residential projects in town limits of Walls. The first industrial tenant, Sigma Supply Co., has moved into a new  building off US 61 and Star Landing Road in the Leatherman  industrial park. Sigma Supply is a distributor of industrial and packaging equipment and facilities supplies. The  Leatherman Planned Unit Development in Walls touts a new elementary school with 900 students, which opened in August 2008, joining Lake Cormorant Middle School that currently has 700 students. Lake Cormorant High School opened in 2011.

Notable people
Gene Alday, member of the Mississippi House of Representatives from 2012 to 2016
Martaveous McKnight, professional basketball player
Leslie B. McLemore, civil rights activist and political scientist
Memphis Minnie, musician
Harvey Wippleman, former WWF professional wrestler

References

External links

Town of Walls official website
Walls Police Department
DeSoto County Schools
DeSoto County website

Towns in Mississippi
Towns in DeSoto County, Mississippi
Memphis metropolitan area